Kukulcania arizonica, commonly called the Arizona black hole spider is a species of spider belonging to the family Filistatidae. As the scientific and common names suggest, this spider is found in Arizona, and the neighbouring US states of New Mexico, Nevada and California.

This is a black spider with a velvety texture. It builds a silken tube in a crevice, often on the wall of a building, with silken threads radiating from the entrance. The female, around 13 mm in length (excluding legs), can live for several years. The male is  dissimilar, having noticeably longer legs and a thinner body.

References

 

Filistatidae
Spiders of the United States
Spiders described in 1935
Taxa named by Wilton Ivie